Baseball has not traditionally been played at the Southeast Asian Games, but a baseball tournament was held at the 2005 and 2007 games, then again in 2011.

Results

Medal summary
As of 2011

Participating nations

See also
 Baseball at the Asian Games